Bingit is a 2013 Philippine television docudrama anthology broadcast by GMA Network. Directed by Rico Gutierrez and Lem Lorca, it premiered on September 21, 2013 on the network's Sabado Star Power sa Hapon line up. The show concluded on November 16, 2013 with a total of 9 episodes. It was replaced by Out of Control in its timeslot.

Format
The forty-five-minute "human drama" centers on the comprehensive re-enactment of the chain of events leading to the actual accidents or life-threatening circumstances as told by the person involved. Using the elements of interview, dramatization, actual footage, and photos, the television program magnifies how one's decision, coupled with the power of the human spirit, can overcome any situation.

Production and development
According to the show's program manager, Enri Calaycay, the concept of the show started not to tell stories literally about the "near-death" experiences but to show what happens when a person comes to a tipping point of his life that would make him realize that he has to make a decision.

Calaycay further stated "[...] when we presented the concept, there was an input that to make it easier for viewers to understand, because the initial concept was quite 'general'. [So] they said why not use literally the "bingit", after all, near-death stories are interesting too." Thus, the production team wasted no time pulling together stories that are interesting and remarkable. The production also decided not to hire presenter as they wanted to highlight [and for the audience to focus] more on the featured stories.

The show is slated to run for one season, comprises nine episodes. The show premiered on September 21, 2013, with the episode "Sulyap ng Kamatayan" (lit. Glimpse of Death), which featured the story of Sr. Insp. June Paulo Abrazado, the aide-de-camp of the late Department of the Interior and Local Government secretary Jesse Robredo. Abrazado is the lone survivor in the plane crash that killed Robredo, pilot Capt. Jessup Bahinting and co-pilot Kshitiz Chand when the private plane owned by Bahinting crashed in the waters off Masbate in August 2012. According to Calaycay, it is the first time that Abrazado shares his story on television after the accident and death of Robredo. Calaycay also stated that they really wanted to kick off the program, with Abrazado's recollection of the actual happening of what can be considered as "a hair's breadth away from death" moment for him, in time for the annual feast day of Our Lady of Peñafrancia, wherein Robredo and Abrazado are both devotees.
Actor Mark Herras plays Abrazado while Vaness del Moral plays Abrazado's wife Lourvila.

Ratings
According to AGB Nielsen Philippines' Mega Manila household television ratings, the pilot episode of Bingit earned a 9.4% rating. While the final episode scored a 10% rating.

References

External links
 

2013 Philippine television series debuts
2013 Philippine television series endings
Filipino-language television shows
GMA Network original programming
GMA Integrated News and Public Affairs shows
Philippine anthology television series
Television shows set in the Philippines